Tornillo Independent School District is a public school district based in the community of Tornillo, Texas (USA). The district is in El Paso County, and almost all of Tornillo is within this district.

In 2009, the school district was rated "recognized" by the Texas Education Agency.

Schools
Tornillo High School (Grades 9-12)
Tornillo Junior High School (Grades 6-8)
Tornillo Intermediate School (Grades 3-5)
Tornillo Elementary School (Grades PK-2)

References

External links
 

School districts in El Paso County, Texas